Death of a Salesman is a 2000 American made-for-television film adaptation of the 1949 play of the same name by Arthur Miller and directed by Kirk Browning. The film stars American actor Brian Dennehy (who won a Golden Globe Award at the 58th Golden Globe Awards for his performance) as Willy Loman (the Salesman). The film earned two nominations at both the 7th Screen Actors Guild Awards in 2001 and the 52nd Primetime Emmy Awards in 2000.

Cast
Brian Dennehy as Willy Loman
Elizabeth Franz as Linda Loman
Ron Eldard as Biff Loman
Ted Koch as Happy Loman
Howard Witt as Charley
Richard Thompson as Bernard
Allen Hamilton as Uncle Ben
Stephanie March as Miss Forsythe

Awards and nominations
 Directors Guild of America:
Outstanding Directing - Television Film (Browning, nominated)

 Emmy Awards:
Outstanding Actor - Miniseries or Television Film (Dennehy, nominated)
Outstanding Supporting Actress - Miniseries or Television Film (Franz, nominated)

 Golden Globe Awards:
Best Actor - Miniseries or Television Film (Dennehy, won)

 Producers Guild of America:
Television Producer of the Year - Longform (won)

 Screen Actors Guild:
Outstanding Actor - Miniseries or Television Film (Dennehy, won)
Outstanding Actress - Miniseries or Television Film (Franz, nominated)

External links

2000 television films
2000 films
2000 drama films
Films set in Brooklyn
American films based on plays
American television films
Films with screenplays by Arthur Miller
2000s English-language films
Films directed by Kirk Browning